Arthur Walter Albrecht (December 29, 1921 – February 1, 2004) was a professional American football offensive lineman and linebacker in the National Football League.

External links

NFL.com profile

1921 births
2004 deaths
People from Manitowoc, Wisconsin
Players of American football from Wisconsin
American football offensive tackles
American football centers
American football linebackers
Pittsburgh Steelers players
Chicago Cardinals players
Boston Yanks players
Wisconsin Badgers football players
Burials in Wisconsin